Calhoun-Isles is one of the official communities (a grouping of several official neighborhoods) in the U.S. city of Minneapolis. It contains the Uptown business district and the name "Uptown" is frequently (though somewhat incorrectly) used to refer to the entire community. The name of the community refers to its most prominent physical features, the large and publicly accessible lakes, Bde Maka Ska (previously known as "Lake Calhoun") and Lake of the Isles.

Calhoun-Isles is an affluent part of the city, and people of upper middle class means and above, including young professionals and older millionaires, inhabit the community.  The Uptown district is considered by many to be the nighttime playground of the young and trendy of the Twin Cities.

Neighborhoods of Calhoun-Isles
 Bryn Mawr
 Lowry Hill
 Lowry Hill East
 South Uptown
 East Bde Maka Ska
 West Maka Ska
 Cedar-Isles-Dean
 Kenwood
 East Isles

References

Communities in Minneapolis